Gallup Korea's Singer of the Year is selected annually through multiple public surveys conducted across South Korea by Gallup Korea. From 2020, survey is conducted in two categories on the basis of respondents' age group: 13–39, and 40 and above.

List of recipients

2000s

2010s

2020s

Gallery

See also
 Gallup Korea's Actor of the Year
 Gallup Korea's Song of the Year

References

External links
Gallup Korea

Opinion polling in South Korea
Lists of celebrities